Ordan Ramón Aguirre (born February 15, 1955) is a retired Venezuelan football (soccer) player. He competed at the 1980 Summer Olympics in Moscow, Soviet Union, where the Venezuela national football team was eliminated after the preliminary round. Aguirre played for Deportivo Lara. He was also part of Venezuela's squad for the 1979 Copa América tournament.

References

External links
 sports-reference

1955 births
Living people
Venezuelan footballers
Venezuela international footballers
Asociación Civil Deportivo Lara players
Footballers at the 1980 Summer Olympics
Olympic footballers of Venezuela
Association football defenders